Pennsylvania Route 580 (PA 580) is a  state highway located in Indiana County, Pennsylvania.  The southern terminus is at PA 403 in Cherryhill Township.  The northern terminus is at US 219 in Cherry Tree.

Route description

PA 580 begins at an intersection with PA 403 in the community of Kenwood in Cherryhill Township, heading east-northeast on a two-lane undivided road. The route passes through agricultural areas with some homes, passing through Manver. The road continues into Green Township and runs through a mix of farmland and woodland with a few residences, serving the community of Pine Flats. Farther northeast, PA 580 heads into more forested areas with some fields and homes, passing through Spruce and curving to the north-northeast. The route crosses PA 240 in Uniontown and continues through more forests. The road turns east and crosses a R.J. Corman Railroad line, heading into the borough of Cherry Tree. Here, PA 580 becomes Maple Street and enters residential areas, turning north onto Front Street before turning east onto Cherry Street. The route crosses another R.J. Corman Railroad line and the West Branch Susquehanna River, passing more homes and businesses prior to ending at US 219.

Major intersections

See also

References

External links 

Pennsylvania Highways: PA 580

580
Transportation in Indiana County, Pennsylvania